Khazar Ibrahim (born May 30, 1978 in Azerbaijan) is the appointed ambassador of the Republic of Azerbaijan to the United States of America.

Education

Khazar Ibrahim received a master’s degree in international relations (with distinction) from Baku State University and a master’s degree in security studies (with distinction) from Georgetown University. He attended a senior course at the NATO Defense College in Rome in 2000-2001. He taught “Foreign Policy of Azerbaijan” class and “Post-Soviet Azerbaijan politics” seminar at Khazar University in Baku.

Career

A career diplomat, Khazar Ibrahim was appointed as an Ambassador of the Republic of Azerbaijan to the United States of America on July 26, 2021. Previously, he served as an Ambassador of the Republic of Azerbaijan to the Republic of Turkey during 2017-2021. Khazar Ibrahim also served as Head of the Mission of the Republic of Azerbaijan to NATO with the rank of Ambassador Extraordinary and Plenipotentiary between 2011-2017. From 2009 to 2011 he was Deputy Chief of Mission of the Embassy of the Republic of Azerbaijan to the United States of America. In 2007-2009, he was the spokesman of the Azerbaijani Foreign Ministry and deputy spokesman before. In 2005-2006, he worked at the Political-Military Division of the Foreign Ministry, being directly involved in drafting National Security Concept of Azerbaijan and implementation of the Individual Partnership Action Plan with NATO. From September 2002 to September 2005, he served at the Azerbaijani Embassy to the United States. His portfolio included political-military, political, and public diplomacy issues. In 1998-2002, he held several positions at the International Organizations and Security Affairs Departments in the Foreign Ministry, responsible for the bilateral political-military relations, NATO affairs, arms control, disarmament and multilateral security issues.

References

1978 births
Living people
Azerbaijani diplomats